New York, New York is the city of New York, in the state of New York.

New York, New York, may also refer to:
Manhattan, a borough (within New York City) which is coterminous with New York County, New York, and denoted postally as "New York, New York" or "New York, NY"
New York-New York Hotel and Casino, on the Las Vegas Strip in Paradise, Nevada

Music
 New York, N.Y. (album), a 1959 jazz album by George Russell
 "Theme from New York, New York", a 1977 song composed by Kander and Ebb for Liza Minnelli, later covered and popularized by Frank Sinatra
 "New York, New York" (On the Town), a song from the 1944 musical On the Town, also performed by Frank Sinatra and others in the 1949 film adaptation
 "New York, New York", a song by The Last Poets from their eponymous album, 1970
 "New York, New York", a song by Duke Ellington from Eastbourne Performance, 1973
 "New York, New York", a song by Back Street Crawler from The Band Plays On, 1975
 "New York, New York (So Good They Named It Twice)", a 1978 song by Gerard Kenny
 "New York, New York", a song by Johnny Winter from Raisin' Cain, 1980
 "New York New York" (Grandmaster Flash song), 1983
 "New York / N.Y.", a 1983 song by Nina Hagen
 "New York, New York" (Tha Dogg Pound song), 1995
 "New York, New York" (Ryan Adams song), 2001
 "New York, New York" (Ja Rule song), 2004
 "New York, New York" (Moby song), 2006

Films
 New York, New York (1977 film), a 1977 drama by Martin Scorsese
 N.Y., N.Y. (film), a 1957 short by Francis Thompson
 New York New York (2016 film), a 2016 Chinese–Hong Kong romantic drama film

Literature
 New York New York (manga), a 1995 manga by Marimo Ragawa

See also 
 New York (disambiguation)
 New York City (disambiguation)
 NYC (disambiguation)
 NY (disambiguation)